Quero is a town in the province of Belluno, in the Veneto region of northern Italy. It is a frazione of Quero Vas, having been a commune in its own right until 2013.

History 
Quero was founded perhaps by the Greeks. It became feud of the counts of Collalto, and it was territory administered by a popular assembly.
St. Girolamo Emiliani was converted in this city in 1511.
The parish church was a national monument, destroyed in 1917 by the Germans. It has since been completely reconstructed.

Geography 
The territory of Quero is extended along the right side of the lowest valley of the Piave River.

Twin towns
Quero is twinned with:

  Auzat, France
  Vicdessos, France

Cities and towns in Veneto